H. melanoleuca may refer to:
 Heterophasia melanoleuca, a bird species
 Hypercompe melanoleuca, a moth species

See also
 Melanoleuca (disambiguation)